Walter Kolbow (born 27 April 1944, in Spittal an der Drau) is a former German politician of the SPD.

He was Parliamentary State Secretary (1998-2005) in the Federal Ministry of Defense, as well as deputy chairman of SPD Parliamentary Group in German Bundestag (2005-2009).

Early life and career 
After primary school in Ingolstadt and Ochsenfurt (Bavaria), Kolbow graduated from Röntgen-Gymnasium Würzburg in 1964 and subsequently served his compulsory military duty until 1966 at the German Air Force. Today he is Captain of the reserve. Afterwards, Kolbow studied law at the University of Würzburg and the German University of Administrative Sciences in Speyer. In 1970 he obtained the Erstes Juristisches Staatsexamen and in 1974 the Zweites Juristisches Staatsexamen. The year after, Kolbow started working for the local administration of Frankfurt. Between 1978 and 1980 he did scientific research for the Friedrich Ebert Foundation.

Political career 

Kolbow joined the Social Democratic Party of Germany (SPD) in 1967. Until 2008 he was chairman of the regional section of Unterfranken (Bavaria). Today he is its honorary chairman.

Between 1972 until 1976 Kolbow was member of the city council of Ochsenfurt, as well as between 1978 until 1981 of Würzburg.

In the 1980 West German elections, Kolbow became a Member of the German Bundestag. Between 1994 until 1998 he was his parliamentary group's spokesperson for defense policy. As a result of the 1998 elections, he joined the Federal Government of Chancellor Gerhard Schröder and was appointed as Parliamentary State Secretary at the Federal Ministry of Defense under the leadership of successive ministers Rudolf Scharping and Peter Struck until 2005. During his time in office, he also served as Germany´s "Humanitarian Representative to Macedonia" coordinating humanitarian aid in Macedonia. Moreover, Kolbow is well respected for his commitment for injured German soldiers because of radar radiation and posttraumatic stress disorder (PTSD).

Between 2005 and 2009, Kolbow was vice chairperson of the SPD parliamentary group, responsible for foreign and development politics, defense matters and human rights since 2005. After 29 years of parliamentary work Kolbow retired from the German Bundestag in 2009.

After leaving active politics, Kolbow became counsel of the Berlin Consulting Group  supporting public and private institutions in the field of health in Europe. He also serves as chairman of the "Commission on Security and Bundeswehr Issues" which gives advice to SPD´s federal steering committee.

Other activities
 Federal Academy for Security Policy (BAKS), Member of the Advisory Board (since 2015)
 Friedrich Ebert Foundation (FES), Member

Recognition 
 2009 – Constitutional Medal in silver
 2009 – "Honoris Causa"-Medal for being "Upfront with the audience" by Carneval Club Versbach (Würzburg)
 2009 – Honorary Ring of the City of Würzburg
 2012 – Order of Merit of the Federal Republic of Germany

Personal life
Kolbow is married and has two children. His son, Alexander Kolbow (SPD), is city councillor of Würzburg.

References

External links 
 
 Biography of Walter Kolbow at German Bundestag
 

1944 births
Living people
Jurists from Bavaria
University of Würzburg alumni
Members of the Bundestag for Bavaria
Commanders Crosses of the Order of Merit of the Federal Republic of Germany
Members of the Bundestag 2005–2009
Members of the Bundestag 2002–2005
Members of the Bundestag 1998–2002
Members of the Bundestag 1994–1998
Members of the Bundestag for the Social Democratic Party of Germany